Parets may refer to:

 Parets del Vallès, a town in Spain
 Pharez, a figure in the Book of Genesis